The Men's 3000 metres steeplechase at the 2008 Olympic Games took place on 16–18 August at the Beijing Olympic Stadium.

The qualifying standards were 8:24.60 (A standard) and 8:32.00 (B standard).

Brimin Kipruto, who won the silver medal at the 2004 Olympic Games in Athens, became the seventh Kenyan runner in a row to win this event at the Olympics. In total Kenya won nine gold medals in the 3000m steeplechase since 1968, but none of those medalists was ever able to defend his title.

Records
Prior to this competition, the existing world and Olympic records were as follows.

No new world or Olympic records were set for this event.

Results

Round 1

Legend: Q=Qualified top 4 in heat; q=Qualified by time; DNF=Did Not Finish; DNS=Did Not Start; DQ=Disqualified; NR=National Record; PB=Personal Best; SB=Season Best

Final

Splits

References

Athletics at the 2008 Summer Olympics
Steeplechase at the Olympics
Men's events at the 2008 Summer Olympics